State Route 117 (SR 117) is a state highway in Churchill County, Nevada. The route serves farm areas around the southwest side of the city of Fallon.

Route description
From that intersection, the route follows the two-lane Sheckler Cut Off due south through farm lands and ranches. The route continues to travel through the agricultural areas of Fallon on its trek east. After almost  along Sheckler Road, the route passes by the Churchill County Fairground and the Churchill County High School. SR 117 then meets its eastern terminus at the intersection of Sheckler Road and US 95 south of downtown Fallon.

History
This designation was in place by 1957.

Major intersections

See also

References

117
Transportation in Churchill County, Nevada